The Chatham-Kent Municipal Council is the governing body of the Municipality of Chatham-Kent in southwestern Ontario, Canada.

The municipality is divided into six wards. Each ward elects a different number of members to council.

Current members
Elected in the 2022 municipal election

References

Chatham-Kent
Municipal councils in Ontario